Winkburn is a small village and civil parish in the Newark and Sherwood district, in Nottinghamshire, England. It is located north-west of Southwell and north-west of Newark.

The parish church of St John of Jerusalem and Winkburn Hall are both Grade I listed buildings.

References

External links

Villages in Nottinghamshire
Newark and Sherwood